Rhys or Reece Williams may refer to:

Sportspeople
R. H. Williams (rugby union) (1930–1993), Welsh rugby union player; full name Rhys Haydn Williams
Rhys Williams (rugby union, born 1980), Welsh rugby union player
Rhys Williams (hurdler) (born 1984), Welsh athlete
Reece Williams (born 1985), Australian rugby player
Reece Williams (cricketer) (born 1988), South African cricketer
Rhys Williams (rugby union, born 1988), Welsh rugby union player who plays at centre for Llanelli Scarlets
Rhys Williams (soccer, born 1988), Australian professional association football player
Rhys Williams (rugby league) (born 1989), Welsh rugby league player
Rhys Williams (rugby union, born 1990), Welsh rugby union player who plays at hooker for Cardiff Blues
Rhys Williams (soccer, born 1995), American soccer player
Rhys Williams (footballer, born 2001), English footballer

Actors
Rhys Williams (Canadian actor) (born 1983), actor and stunt performer
Rhys Williams (Welsh actor) (1897–1969), Welsh actor

Others
Rhys Rhys-Williams (1865–1955), British Liberal MP
Albert Rhys Williams (1883–1962), Welsh-American political activist
Rhys H. Williams (sociologist) (born 1957), professor of sociology
Rhys Lindell Williams (born 1965), American businessman, technology investor, military veteran, and civic leader

Characters
Rhys Williams (Torchwood), portrayed in British science fiction series Torchwood
Rhys Williams, a primary character in the 1977 novel Bloodline, by Sidney Sheldon
Reese Williams and Bianca Montgomery, lesbian couple portrayed on American drama All My Children

See also
Williams (surname)